Luca Paganini (born 8 June 1993) is an Italian footballer who plays as a striker for  club Triestina.

Club career 

Paganini is a youth exponent from Frosinone Calcio. He made his first team debut on 18 December 2011 against U.S. Siracusa in a Lega Pro Prima Divisione game. He came in as an 89th-minute substitute for Fabio Catacchini in a 1-0 away defeat. He was loaned out to Fondi for six months from January 2013 until June 2013. He scored his first Serie A goal on 18 October 2015 with Frosinone after a 2–0 defeat of Sampdoria.

On 7 September 2020, he joined Lecce.

On 27 January 2022, he signed with Ascoli until the end of the 2021–22 season.

On 24 August 2022, Paganini signed a two-year contract with Triestina.

References

1993 births
Living people
Footballers from Rome
Italian footballers
Association football forwards
Frosinone Calcio players
S.S. Racing Club Fondi players
U.S. Lecce players
Ascoli Calcio 1898 F.C. players
U.S. Triestina Calcio 1918 players
Serie A players
Serie B players
Serie C players